Mikhail Viktorovich Mullyar (born 5 March 1989) is a Russian former professional football player.

Club career
He made his Russian Football National League debut for FC Mashuk-KMV Pyatigorsk on 19 April 2008 in a game against FC Alania Vladikavkaz.

External links
 

1989 births
Living people
Russian footballers
Association football defenders
FC Mashuk-KMV Pyatigorsk players